Stokłosy is a residential neighborhood in the Ursynów district of Warsaw, Poland.

Stokłosy is located within the area of the Municipal Information System of Northern Ursynów (Ursynów Północny). According to the State Register of Geographical Names, the residential neighborhood is a part of the city with the ID number 131429. Its area is run by, among others Jastrzębowski, Stokłosa, Zamiany, Béla Bartók, Bacewiczówna and the Union of Youth Struggle (Związki Walki Młodych) Streets. Stokłosy is an area with a predominance of multi-family housing.

History 
On May 14, 1951, by the decree of the Council of Ministers, the area of the later Stokłosy was incorporated into the administrative boundaries of Warsaw along with the rest of the Wilanów commune. From March 1994, Stokłosy is within the boundaries of Ursynów.

See also 
 Stokłosy metro station

References 

Neighbourhoods of Ursynów